Janicza Michelle Bravo Ford (born February 25, 1981) is an American film director, film producer, and screenwriter. Her films include Gregory Go Boom, a winner of the short-film jury award at the Sundance Film Festival; Lemon, co-written with Brett Gelman; and Zola, co-written with playwright Jeremy O. Harris.

Early life and education
Bravo was born in New York City, the daughter of Ana María Ford and Rafael Ángel Landers. Her parents, who are tailors, are both from Colón, Panama. Her mother enlisted in the U.S. military when Bravo was an infant. From the time she was three months old to a teenager, she grew up between Colón and an Army base in Panama City, Panama, until her family moved back to the United States. She spent time going back and forth between the United States and Panama throughout her childhood. When she was 12, her family moved to Crown Heights, Brooklyn.

Bravo attended the Playwrights Horizons Theater School of the New York University Tisch School of the Arts, where she majored in directing and design for theater, which included costume and set design.

Several years after college, she moved to Los Angeles, worked as a stylist and produced small theater productions before she was approached by a cinematographer who offered assistance with filmmaking.

Career 
After graduating from college Bravo worked as a stylist and wardrobe designer.

Bravo got her start writing and directing a series of short films. Her first film, Eat, starred Katherine Waterston and Brett Gelman and debuted at the 2011 SXSW Film Festival and was picked up by Vice. The film told the story of a woman who is locked out of her apartment and meets an odd neighbor.

Her second film, the 2013 dark comedy named Gregory Go Boom, won the short-film jury award at the Sundance Film Festival and featured Michael Cera as a paraplegic who lives near the Salton Sea. The film was shot on location in Bombay Beach and Slab City, California. Bravo worked with JASH to produce and release the film online. The film's title was inspired by the 1976 François Truffaut film, Small Change, where the boy falls out the window yet survives.

Her third short film, 2014's Pauline Alone, features Gaby Hoffmann as a Craigslist-obsessed woman. In 2014, she was named one of Filmmaker magazine's "25 New Faces of Independent Film".

In 2015, Bravo shot a featurette on Victoria Beckham for Glamours 25th Anniversary Women of the Year Awards called "Victoria Beckham Is Living a Life Filled with Style and Grace".

In 2016, Bravo released the short film, Hard World for Small Things, a live-action virtual reality film that was a "day in the life" depiction of South Central. The project was grant funded by Eve Cohen and James Kaelan of Seed and Spark. The film was inspired by the death of a cousin, visiting from Panama, who in the summer of 1999 was asphyxiated by the police in the Flatbush neighborhood of Brooklyn is a case of mistaken identity. It was shot using GoPro cameras for the virtual reality company Wevr, and was shown at the Sundance Film Festival, Tribeca Film Festival, and the AFI Festival Los Angeles. The title of the film was inspired by a line of dialog in the 1955 film noir film, The Night of the Hunter, and marked a distinct departure in theme, as it focused on race and politics.

Also in 2016, Bravo took the short, Woman in Deep, to the 2016 SXSW Film Festival. The film stars Alison Pill and was grant-funded via The Nantucket Project.

In 2016, Bravo directed her first feature, an independent film called Lemon, which she co-wrote with then-husband Brett Gelman. The film stars Gelman, Michael Cera, and Judy Greer, and includes performances by Nia Long, Fred Melamed, Shiri Appleby, Rhea Perlman, David Paymer, Gillian Jacobs, Megan Mullally, Martin Starr, Jeff Garlin, and Marla Gibbs. After a somewhat turbulent pre-production process, the film was picked up by Killer Films and Burn Later Productions and premiered at Sundance in 2017.

In addition to creating her own work, Bravo directed season 1 episode 9, "Juneteenth", of the FX television show Atlanta, which stars and was created by Donald Glover, as well as season 3 episode 5, "Bertie's Birthday", of the Netflix television show Love, which was created by and stars Paul Rust.

Bravo's latest film, Zola, was directed and co-written by Bravo, along with playwright Jeremy O. Harris. The film is based on a 148-tweet thread by Detroit waitress Aziah "Zola" Wells about a trip she took to Florida with a sex worker named Jessica. Zola had its world premiere at the 2020 Sundance Film Festival, where it was nominated for the Grand Jury Award.

In 2022, Bravo was one of nine directors commissioned to design a series of rooms at the Metropolitan Museum Of Art for the exhibition In America: An Anthology of Fashion.

Personal life 
Bravo speaks Spanish fluently and is Latina. Bravo is Jewish.

In December 2015, Bravo married her long-time boyfriend, actor Brett Gelman.  Gelman and Bravo met in New York City while working on a New York Lotto commercial. In 2016, they resided in Los Angeles. They divorced in 2018.

Awards 
 2014: Sundance Film Festival, Short Film Grand Jury Prize (nominated) – Gregory Go Boom
 2014: Sundance Film Festival, Short Film Jury Award: US Fiction – Gregory Go Boom

Filmography 
 2011: Eat (Short) – Writer, Director, Editor
 2013: Gregory Go Boom (Short) – Producer, Writer, Director, Editor
 2014: Pauline Alone (Short) – Producer, Writer, Director, Editor
 2015: Woman of the Year (Short) – Director
 2015: Hot Package (TV series) – Writer, 5 episodes
 2016: Hard World for Small Things (Short) – Producer, Writer, Director
 2016: Woman in Deep (Short) – Producer, Writer, Director
 2016: Man Rots From the Head (Short) – Producer, Writer, Director
 2016: The New Yorker presents: Couple's First Dinner Party, Serves Six (Short) – Director, Writer
 2016: Atlanta (TV series) – Director, 1 episode: "Juneteenth"
 2017: Lemon – Producer, Writer, Director
 2017: Hell In The Afternoon (Short) – Producer, Writer, Director
 2018: Forever (TV series) – Director
 2020: Zola – Writer, Director
 2020: Mrs. America (TV series) - Director
 2021: In Treatment (TV series) - Director
 2021: Them (TV series) - Director
 2022: Kindred (TV series) - Director

References

External links 
 
 

1981 births
Living people
American expatriates in Panama
American people of Panamanian descent
American women film directors
New York University alumni
Film directors from New York City
Hispanic and Latino American writers
Hispanic and Latino American film directors
African-American film directors
African-American Jews
African-American screenwriters
African-American photographers
21st-century American screenwriters
21st-century American women writers
21st-century African-American women writers
21st-century African-American writers
20th-century African-American people
20th-century African-American women